Marcus Rowland (born March 11, 1990) is an American sprinter who specialises in the 100 and 200 metres.

High school career
Rowland attended Paul M. Dorman High School in Roebuck, South Carolina, where he was a two-time South Carolina state champion in the 100 and 200 metres and broke a 17-year-old state record in the 100 metres, previously held by Stephen Davis of Spartanburg High School. At the 2008 Taco Bell Invitational in Columbia, he won the 100 m and 200 m with personal bests of 10.28 and 21.07, respectively. He was an All-American track and field selection by USA Today in 2008. Rowland also competed at the USA Junior National Championships in 2008.

College career
In his first year at Auburn, Rowland finished third in the 200 meters at the 2009 NCAA Championships, clocking a time of 20.82 in the finals into a headwind while running from lane 1. He finished third in both the 100m and 200m at the 2009 SEC Outdoor Championships, and ran on both relays. In the 100 meters, his time in the finals of 10.13 seconds ranks fourth best in Auburn history.

Following the Auburn track season, Rowland won the 100 meters at the U.S. Junior National Championships, as he clocked a wind-aided time of 10.02 sec. He also helped the United States 4×100 metres relay squad to a gold medal. Rowland was named " SEC Male Freshman Runner of the Year" in May 2009.

At the 2010 NCAA Indoor Track and Field Championships, Rowland finished second in the 60 metres, behind only Jeffery Demps, with a personal best of 6.58 seconds.

Personal best

References

External links

DyeStat profile for Marcus Rowland
Auburn Tigers biography

1990 births
Living people
American male sprinters
Auburn Tigers men's track and field athletes